Jeffrey M. Lamberti (born October 21, 1962, in Ankeny, Iowa) is a former Republican Senate leader and two term state senator representing the 35th District of the Iowa Senate, and served two terms as State Representative. In the 2006 mid-term election, Lamberti was the Republican nominee for U.S. Congress in Iowa's 3rd congressional district, losing to incumbent Democrat Leonard Boswell in a hotly contested race. Lamberti received 46% of the vote to Boswell's 52%. He was succeeded in the Iowa Senate by Republican Larry Noble.

Lamberti was nominated to the Iowa Racing and Gaming Commission by Gov. Terry Branstad. He was elected as its chairman on June 7, 2012, and his term expired on April 30, 2014.

Lamberti is an attorney and is president of Lamberti, Gocke, & Leutje Law Offices. He is the son of Donald Lamberti, founder of Ankeny-based Casey's General Stores. He is the current owner of the Indoor Football League's Iowa Barnstormers (formerly of the Arena Football League and af2).

Electoral history

References

External links

Jeff Lamberti's Congressional campaign site
 
Jeffrey M. Lamberti profile @ Block, Lamberti & Gocke, P.C.
Iowa General Assembly page on Lamberti - from when he was in the Iowa Senate.
Jeff Lamberti Casey's stock history

1962 births
Living people
People from Ankeny, Iowa
Drake University alumni
Iowa lawyers
Republican Party members of the Iowa House of Representatives
Republican Party Iowa state senators
Drake University Law School alumni